The 1952 Texas Western Miners football team was an American football team that represented Texas Western College (now known as University of Texas at El Paso) as a member of the Border Conference during the 1952 college football season. In its third season under head coach Mike Brumbelow, the team compiled a 5–5–1 record (2–3–1 against Border Conference opponents), finished fifth in the conference, and was outscored by a total of 235 to 228.

Schedule

References

Texas Western
UTEP Miners football seasons
Texas Western Miners football